Duluth, Minnesota is a city in the United States.

Duluth or DuLuth may also refer to:

 Duluth, Georgia, a suburb of Atlanta, in the United States
 Duluth, Kansas, an unincorporated community
 Duluth, Nebraska, an unincorporated community
 Duluth, Washington, a census-designated place
 Duluth (album), an album by Trampled by Turtles
 Duluth (novel), by Gore Vidal
 "Duluth", a song by Mason Jennings from his 2000 album Birds Flying Away
 , light cruiser commissioned late in World War II
 , amphibious transport dock commissioned in 1966
 Daniel Greysolon, Sieur du Lhut, French explorer whose name is sometimes anglicized as DuLuth
 Duluth model, a program developed to reduce domestic violence

See also 
 Duluth University (disambiguation)
 Roman Catholic Diocese of Duluth
 Glacial Lake Duluth
 Duluth Complex, a geological formation in northeastern Minnesota
 Duluth, Missabe and Iron Range Railway
 Duluth, South Shore and Atlantic Railway
 Duluth, Winnipeg and Pacific Railway